The Mount Airy Lodge, built in the 1890s, was a five-star hotel and resort located in Paradise Township near Mount Pocono, Pennsylvania. It was closed in October 2001 and demolished in subsequent years. The site now houses Mount Airy Casino Resort.

History
Constructed in 1898 as an eight-room inn, Mount Airy Lodge was re-constructed in the 1950s as the Pocono's largest resort. In its heyday in the 1960s and 70's, Mount Airy had more than 890 rooms, indoor/outdoor pools, skiing, snowmobiling, ice-skating, hiking, biking, horseback riding, archery, an 18-hole golf course and paddle ball courts on over 1,000 acres of property.

Fame
For more than half a century Mount Airy Lodge was known as America's premier honeymoon hideaway, with floor-to-ceiling mirrors, velvet-swagged canopy beds, and heart-shaped bathtubs. It was also known for its top entertainment. The Crystal Room, Mount Airy's 2,000-seat show palace, hosted headliners like Bob Hope, Milton Berle, Connie Francis, Red Buttons, Tony Bennett, Paul Anka, and Nipsey Russell.

Legacy 
The resort closed in October 2001 and was demolished in subsequent years. The site now houses Mount Airy Casino Resort.

References

Hotels in Pennsylvania
Pocono Mountains
1898 establishments in Pennsylvania
Hotel buildings completed in 1898
2001 disestablishments in Pennsylvania